NHL FaceOff is a video game series published by Sony Computer Entertainment and based on the National Hockey League. Originally released for the PlayStation, the game spawned many sequels for both the PlayStation and PlayStation 2, with the last one being released in 2002. It was one of the original SCEA sports games series for the PlayStation, along with NBA ShootOut, NFL GameDay, NCAA GameBreaker and ESPN Extreme Games (later renamed the Xtreme Games series). The first game was released in North America in 1995. The game featured multiplayer.

The series was later succeeded by Gretzky NHL 2005.

Installments

See also
 ESPN National Hockey Night, Sony's predecessor for 16-bit consoles.
 List of ice hockey video games

References

1995 video games
Sony Interactive Entertainment franchises
NHL FaceOff
PlayStation (console) games
PlayStation 2 games
Video games developed in the United States